Carleton D. Powell (born 1939 in South Carolina), was a special trial judge of the United States Tax Court.

Education
Powell attended the Kent School in Kent, Connecticut, graduating in 1957. He received a B.A. degree from the University of Virginia in 1961 and his LL.B. from the University of Richmond in 1967.

Career
Powell served as a commissioned officer in the United States Army between 1962 and 1964. From 1967 to 1970, he was employed in various positions by the Internal Revenue Service. In 1970 he became a Trial Attorney in the Appellate Section of the United States Department of Justice Tax Division; in 1977, he was promoted to a Senior Trial Attorney. Between 1980 and 1985, Powell was a Reviewer. He was appointed as a Special Trial Judge of the U.S. Tax Court on August 25, 1985.

References
 US Tax Court bio of Carleton Powell

1939 births
Special trial judges of the United States Tax Court
Living people
Kent School alumni